Yuji Ichioka (June 23, 1936 – September 1, 2002) was an American historian and civil rights activist best known for his work in ethnic studies, particularly Asian American Studies and for being a leader in the Asian American movement. An adjunct professor at UCLA, he and Emma Gee coined the term "Asian American" in 1968 during the founding of the Asian American Political Alliance, to help unify different Asian ethnic groups (e.g. Japanese Americans, Chinese Americans, Filipino Americans, etc.), and was considered the preeminent scholar of Japanese American history.

Early life and education
Yuji Ichioka was born in 1936 in San Francisco, California.  As a child, he was interned with his family at the Topaz War Relocation Center in Utah following the signing of Executive Order 9066. The family returned to San Francisco after their release from camp, and he finished grade school there, graduating from Berkeley High School in 1954.

After three years of military service, Ichioka enrolled at UCLA, earning an undergraduate degree in history in 1962. The following year, he started a graduate program at Columbia University, studying Chinese history but soon dropped out and instead worked for a social service agency in New York. In 1966, he took an extended trip to Japan and, upon his return, enrolled at UC Berkeley, receiving an M.A. in Asian Studies in 1968.

Career 
Ichioka founded the Asian American Political Alliance in 1968 during his time at Berkeley, and coined the term "Asian American" for it with Emma Gee, to frame a new self-defining political lexicon. (Before the adoption of this term, people of Asian ancestry were generally called Oriental or Asiatic.)  In 1969, Ichioka taught the first Asian American Studies course at UCLA and was named associate director of the university's newly formed Asian American Studies Center.  Ichioka later served as a senior researcher at the UCLA Asian American Studies Center and Adjunct Professor of History at the University of California, Los Angeles (UCLA) from approximately 1969 to 2002.

His seminal work, Issei: The World of the First Generation Japanese Immigrants, 1885-1924, won the 1989 U.S. History Book Award of the National Association for Asian American Studies. Ichioka recorded subsequent research in the two books: A Buried Past and A Buried Past II.

Legacy 
He died from cancer on September 1, 2002. He was survived by his wife of over 25 years, Emma Gee.

The Yuji Ichioka and Emma Gee Endowment in Social Justice and Immigration Studies was established in their name at the UCLA Asian American Studies Center.

Selected publications

References

See also 

1936 births
2002 deaths
Japanese-American internees
20th-century American historians
20th-century American male writers
Writers from San Francisco
Berkeley High School (Berkeley, California) alumni
University of California, Berkeley alumni
American academics of Japanese descent
Historians from California
American male non-fiction writers
Deaths from cancer